Generic character may refer to:

 Generic character (fiction)
 Generic character (mathematics), a character on a class group of binary quadratic forms